Nikta Fakhri is an Iranian-American physicist who is the Thomas D. & Virginia W. Cabot Career Development Associate Professor of Physics at the Massachusetts Institute of Technology. Her research considers non-equilibrium physics in living systems. She was awarded the 2022 American Physical Society Early Career Award for Soft Matter Research.

Early life and education 
Fakhri grew up in Tehran. She was an undergraduate student at the Sharif University of Technology. After completing her bachelor's degree, Fakhri moved to Rice University, where she studied carbon nanotube dynamics in complex media. Her doctoral research considered the dynamics of single walled carbon nanotubes in water. Specifically, Fakhri has proposed the use of near-infrared fluorescence of carbon nanotubes as independent reporters of cellular systems. Fakhri joined the Georg-August-Universität as a postdoctoral researcher.

Research and career 
In 2015, Fakhri joined the faculty at Massachusetts Institute of Technology, where she works in the physics of living systems group. In particular, Fakhri studies the processes in living and non-living matter that create non-equilibrium materials. These materials can display anomalous fluctuations, non-equilibrium phase transitions and unusual rheological properties. For example, Fakhri studied the concentrations of Rho-GTP on the cell membrane of Patiria miniata. By labelling the Rho-GTP in egg cells with a fluorescent protein, Fakhri could study the cell dynamics under the microscope. She showed that protein concentration varied in waves across the protein, forming patterns with two different types of swirling vortices.

Awards and honors 
 2016 Human Frontier Science Program Organization Career Development Award
 2017 Alfred P. Sloan Research Fellowship
 2018 Thomas D. and Virginia W. Cabot Professor
 2018 IUPAP Young Scientist Prize in Biological Physics
 2019 National Science Foundation CAREER Award
 2019 Kavli Foundation Frontiers Scholar
 2022 American Physical Society Early Career Award for Soft Matter Research

Selected publications

References 

Living people
Scientists from Tehran
Sharif University of Technology alumni
Rice University alumni
Massachusetts Institute of Technology faculty
Iranian emigrants to the United States
21st-century American physicists
Iranian women physicists
Year of birth missing (living people)